Frank A. Salvatore (June 2, 1922 – July 16, 2014) was an American politician from Pennsylvania who served as a Republican member of the Pennsylvania State Senate for the 5th district from 1985 to 2001 and the Pennsylvania House of Representatives for the 170th district from 1973 to 1984.

Early life and education
Salvatore was born in Philadelphia, Pennsylvania and graduated from Northeast High School.  He attended St Joseph's College of Industrial Relations and took courses at the Fels Institute of Government at the University of Pennsylvania.  He received an honorary doctorate degree from Holy Family College.  He served as a U.S. Marine sergeant in the Pacific Theater during World War II from 1942 to 1945.

Career
In 1958, Salvatore became the chairman of L&M Beverage Co. Inc., a wholesale beer distributor and operated the business until he sold it in 2001.

He was elected to the Pennsylvania House of Representatives for the 170th district and served for five consecutive terms.  He was elected Minority Caucus Administrator from 1977 to 1978 and again from 1983 to 1984.  He was elected Majority Caucus Administrator from 1979 to 1982.  He was not a candidate for reelection to the House in 1984.

He was elected to the Pennsylvania State Senate for the 5th district and served from 1985 to 2000.  He was an outspoken critic of Mayor Wilson Goode.  He presented the legislature with a bill proposing secession of Northeast Philadelphia from the rest of the city to form an entity called Liberty County but it found no broad political support.  He lost reelection to the Senate in 2000.

He died in July 2014 at a Holy Redeemer Hospital in Meadowbrook, Pennsylvania and is interred at the Resurrection Cemetery in Philadelphia.

References

External links
 – official PA Senate profile (archived)

1922 births
2014 deaths
20th-century American politicians
21st-century American politicians
United States Marine Corps personnel of World War II
Fels Institute of Government alumni
Republican Party members of the Pennsylvania House of Representatives
Republican Party Pennsylvania state senators